The Gawad Urian Best Actor, (officially, the Pinakamahusay na Pangunahing Aktor) is a movie award given by the Manunuri ng Pelikulang Pilipino (Filipino Film Critics) to lead actors in a Philippine movie.

Winners and nominees
In the lists below, the winner of the award for each year is shown first, followed by the other nominees.

1970s

1980s

1990s

2000s

2010s

Superlatives

Multiple awards for Best Actor
Three awards 
Richard Gomez
Phillip Salvador

Two awards
Eddie Garcia
Raymond Bagatsing
Christopher de Leon
Sid Lucero
Vic Silayan
Joel Torre

References

Film awards for lead actor
Philippine film awards
Awards established in 1977